The 1949 Nations Grand Prix was the fifth round of the 1949 Grand Prix motorcycle racing season. It took place at the Autodromo Nazionale Monza.

Italian rider Nello Pagani won the 500 cc race riding a Gilera from Arciso Artesiani and Bill Doran.

Despite Dario Ambrosini winning the 250 cc race, a fourth-place finish for Italian Moto Guzzi rider Bruno Ruffo was enough for him to win the 250 cc championship, the only championship in the first season with results close enough to be still in doubt at the final race.

500 cc classification

250 cc classification

125 cc classification

References

Italian motorcycle Grand Prix
Nations Grand Prix
Nations Grand Prix